Single-issue politics involves political campaigning or political support based on one essential policy area or idea.

Political expression

One weakness of such an approach is that effective political parties are usually coalitions of factions or advocacy groups. Bringing together political forces based on a single intellectual or cultural common denominator can be unrealistic; though there may be considerable public opinion on one side of an argument, it does not necessarily follow that mobilizing under that one banner will bring results. A defining issue may indeed come to dominate one particular electoral campaign, sufficiently to swing the result. Imposing such an issue may well be what single-issue politics concern; but for the most part success is rather limited, and electorates choose governments for reasons with a broader base.

Single-issue politics may express itself through the formation of a single-issue party, an approach that tends to be more successful in parliamentary systems based on proportional representation than in rigid two-party systems (like that of the United States). Alternatively, it may proceed through political advocacy groups of various kinds, including Lobby groups, pressure groups and other forms of political expression external to normal representative government. Within a broad-based party it may be the concern of a single-issue caucus.

Very visible as it was in Western democracies in the second half of the twentieth century, single-issue politics is hardly a new phenomenon. In the 1880s, the third government of William Ewart Gladstone made British politics in practical terms single-issue, around the Home Rule Bill, leading to a split of the Liberal Party.

Groups and voters

Single-issue politics are a form of litmus test; common examples are abortion, taxation, animal rights, environment, and guns. The National Rifle Association in the United States, which has only one specific interest, is an example of a single-issue group. What differentiates single-issue groups from other interest groups is their intense style of lobbying.

The term single-issue voter has been used to describe people who may make voting decisions based on the candidates' stance on a single issue (e.g. support or opposition to abortion rights,  for gun rights or gun control). The existence of single-issue voters can give a distorted impression: a candidate's overall views may not enjoy the same support. For example, a person who votes for a socially liberal Republican candidate, based solely on their support of abortion, may not necessarily share the candidate's other views on social issues, such as gun rights or family values.

Single-issue parties

A single-issue party is a political party that campaigns on only one issue.

It is generally believed that single-issue parties are favored by voluntary voting systems, as they tend to attract very committed supporters who will always vote. Through systems like instant runoff voting and proportional representation they can have substantial influence on the results of elections. First-past-the-post voting systems tend to nullify their influence, but local single-issue parties, such as Independent Kidderminster Hospital and Health Concern, which sought to reopen the Accident and Emergency unit at Kidderminster Hospital, may see more success under this voting system. This party won the Wyre Forest seat, where the hospital is located, at two consecutive general elections (in 2001 and 2005) in the United Kingdom. The party went on to become a national party, the National Health Action Party. Similar parties in the UK are the Save Huddersfield NHS party which had representation on Kirklees Council, and Save Chase Farm party.

In instant-runoff electoral systems which allow unsuccessful parties to designate where their votes are redistributed, single-issue parties may be formed as a way to funnel more votes to another candidate with quite different policies. For instance, in the 1999 New South Wales state election, candidate Malcolm Jones received just 0.2% of the primary vote, but achieved the quota of 4.5% required to win a Legislative Council seat after receiving preferences from a wide range of minor parties (including both the 'Gun Owners and Sporting Hunters Rights Party' and the 'Animal Liberation Party'); MLC Lee Rhiannon accused many of these parties of being nothing more than fronts.

A similar type of political party have been numerous in the Netherlands, where they are called testimonial parties. Testimonial parties are often concentrated around a specific set of principles or policies which they seek to promote without the compromises contingent on ordinary coalition politics. Examples of some successful testimonial parties are the Party for the Animals, the Reformed Political Party, or the former Pacifist Socialist Party.

Other single-issue parties focus on the interests of a specific target group, such as ethnic minorities, retirees, and students.

Green parties, cannabis political parties and pirate parties which exist in a number of countries, are explicitly based around the single issues of environmental protection, cannabis legalization and copyright liberalization respectively.  These parties often evolve to adopt a full platform, however.

Europe
The most successful electorally British single issue party is the pro-Brexit UKIP which later due to its success started to formulate other policies. As its consequences started to become clear, its former leader Nigel Farage left and founded the Brexit Party, renamed Reform UK as the withdrawal process gained momentum.

Other single issue parties in the UK are anti-devolution Abolish the Scottish Parliament Party and Abolish the Welsh Assembly Party, animal rights advocates Animal Protection Party and the Animal Welfare Party and the pro fox-hunting Countryside Party. There was also the electoral reform advocates No Candidate Deserves My Vote! party.

In 2019, an anti-environmentalist Polish political party called the Party of Drivers was formed with the aim of "fighting for the rights of drivers and hauliers".

In Norway, there is also a party called Patient Focus (Norway) as a support movement for an expansion of the Alta hospital in Finnmark.

North America
The Anti-Masonic Party opposed Freemasonry.

Rent is Too Damn High is focused on housing.

Oceania
In Australia, a number of single issue parties have been elected to federal and state parliaments such as the Animal Justice Party, Dignity for Disability, the Australian Reason Party, Australian Motoring Enthusiast Party.

See also

Big tent
Identity politics
Issue voting
Protest vote
Voting bloc

References